In mathematics, an Eisenstein sum is a finite sum depending on a finite field and related to a Gauss sum. Eisenstein sums were introduced by Eisenstein in 1848, named "Eisenstein sums" by Stickelberger in 1890, and rediscovered by Yamamoto in 1985, who called them relative Gauss sums.

Definition

The Eisenstein sum is given by

where F is a finite extension of the finite field K, and χ is a character of the multiplicative group of F, and α is an element of K.

References

Bibliography

 

Algebraic number theory